Argopecten purpuratus is an edible marine species of saltwater shellfish, a bivalve mollusk in the family Pectinidae.

Habitat
This scallop is natural to certain bays in the Southern west coast of south America, from Peru to Chile.

Peru
In Peru, the scallops can be found in large numbers naturally around the following bays:
 Pisco (300 km South of Lima)
 Casma y Samanco (400 km north of Lima)
 Trujillo (600 km north of Lima)
 Sechura Bay & Paita Bay (900 km north of Lima)

Commercial value
The scallops can be harvested and commercialized to several markets around the world.

In most growth areas, the harvesting of natural grown scallops has been replaced by aquaculture operations.
The aquaculture operations consist in re-stocking the natural areas, taking care of the scallops along the grow out period and harvesting at the end of the cycle.
Thanks to this practices, the natural banks have recovered and are able to maintain a sustainable production level.

Markets
The demand of scallops is mainly from following markets:
 USA: Roe Off product
 France: Roe-On product
 China: Roe-On & Skirt-On, Whole, products
 Australia and New Zealand: Roe-On product
 Spain and Italy: Roe-On on Half shell product

References

External links
 www.sealifebase.org/

Commercial molluscs
Bivalves described in 1819
purpuratus
Taxa named by Jean-Baptiste Lamarck
Invertebrates of Peru